Plaesiorrhina cinctuta is a beetle belonging to the family Scarabaeidae.

Description
The basic colour is dark green, with a transversal orange band on the elytra.

Distribution
This species can be found in the Afrotropical region (mainly in Cameroon, Democratic Republic of Congo, Ivory Coast, Tanzania and Uganda).

References
 Biolib
 Universal Biological Indexer

External links
 World Field Guide
 Curiosité
 Beetle Space

cinctuta
Beetles described in 1779